Sir Alan Meredith Williams  (22 August 1909 – 2 December 1972) was a British diplomat who was ambassador to Panama and Spain.

Career
Williams was educated at Berkhamsted School and Pembroke College, Cambridge. He
entered Her Majesty's Consular Service in 1932 and served successively at San Francisco, USA; Panama; Paris, France; Hamburg, Germany; Rotterdam, the Netherlands; Reykjavík, Iceland;  Leopoldville; Vienna, Austria; 1945–1946, where he was a member of the Allied Control Commission as well; Baghdad, Iraq; New York, USA, (as deputy consul-general from 1950 to 1953); Tunis; the Foreign Office (as an Inspector of Foreign Office Establishments) from 1956 to 1960; and as Consul-General at New York 1960–64. He was Ambassador to Panama 1964–66 and to Spain 1966–69.

In 1946 Williams married Miss Masha Poustchine, an Englishwoman descendant from a Russian family; they had a son, Lawrence, and a daughter, Elizabeth.

Williams was appointed CMG in 1958 and knighted KCMG in 1963.

References

External links
New Yorker interview, 29 October 1960, page 35, by journalist Geoffrey T. Hellman

1909 births
1972 deaths
People educated at Berkhamsted School
Alumni of Pembroke College, Cambridge
Ambassadors of the United Kingdom to Spain
Ambassadors of the United Kingdom to Panama
Knights Commander of the Order of St Michael and St George